Liam Joseph Nolan (born 20 September 1994) is a Northern Irish professional footballer who plays for AFC Telford United.

Career
Nolan began his career with Crewe Alexandra having left Everton's Youth Academy at the age of 16. He made his professional debut on 21 September 2013 in a 1–1 draw against Oldham Athletic.

On 28 April 2014, Nolan signed a new two-year deal with the Railwaymen.

In May 2017 Nolan signed for Accrington Stanley. He scored his first goal for the club in an EFL Trophy tie against Middlesbrough Under-23s on 19 September 2017.

Having won the League Two Championship Accrington exercised a contractual option at the end of the 2017–18 season to retain him.

In November 2018 he joined Salford City on loan until January 2019. His club debut came a few days later in a match against Harrogate Town.

In July 2019 Nolan signed for National league side F.C. Halifax Town on a one-year deal.

In October 2020 signed for National league north side AFC Fylde.

On 17 January 2022, after just 9 appearances in the 2021/22 season, Nolan joined National League North strugglers AFC Telford United on loan until the end of the season. This move was made permanent on 24 March 2022 after he had scored 3 goals in 14 appearances.

Career statistics

References

External links

1994 births
Living people
English footballers
English people of Northern Ireland descent
Association footballers from Northern Ireland
Northern Ireland under-21 international footballers
Crewe Alexandra F.C. players
Southport F.C. players
Accrington Stanley F.C. players
Salford City F.C. players
FC Halifax Town players
AFC Fylde players
AFC Telford United players
English Football League players
National League (English football) players
Association football midfielders